Peter Saili (born 4 January 1988) is a New Zealand rugby player, who plays at the Blindside Flanker/ No 8 position for the Bordeaux.

Early life
Saili was born in Auckland and educated at St Peter's College where he played rugby in the school First XV. He represented New Zealand in schoolboy and global under-age tournaments. After leaving school he played for Auckland Marist. He is the older brother of Blues and All Black centre Francis Saili.

Career
Saili was a junior All Black in 2007 and 2008. In 2007 he was a member of the team which won the International Rugby Board's junior world championship (Under 19), defeating South Africa in the final (31-7). In 2008 he was a member of the New Zealand team which won the International Rugby Board's junior world championship (the inaugural under-20 tournament), pulling off a crushing 38–3 win (four tries to none) over England in Swansea, Wales.

Saili started his professional rugby career in 2008, with a start in the NPC for Auckland against Poverty Bay. In 2009 he commenced playing for the Blues in a match against the Western Force.

On 16 January 2015, it was revealed that The Blues had released Saili with immediate effect to allow him to take up a contract in France

References

External links

1988 births
New Zealand rugby union players
New Zealand sportspeople of Samoan descent
Auckland rugby union players
Blues (Super Rugby) players
Rugby union flankers
Rugby union number eights
People educated at St Peter's College, Auckland
Rugby union players from Auckland
Living people